Arumulai is a village in the Orathanadu taluk of Thanjavur district, Tamil Nadu, India.

Demographics 

As per the 2001 census, Arumulai had a total population of 958 with 488 males and 470 females. The sex ratio was 1085. The literacy rate was 64.58.

References 

 

Villages in Thanjavur district